Tmesisternus politus is a species of longhorn beetles belonging to the family Cerambycidae, subfamily Lamiinae.

Distribution
This species can be found in Papua New Guinea and the Aru Islands.

References

politus